Safsaf is a town and commune in Mostaganem Province, Algeria. It is located in Bouguirat District. According to the 1998 census it has a population of 12,492.

References

Communes of Mostaganem Province